Mrs Biggs is a 2012 British television series based on the true story of the wife of the Great Train Robber, Ronnie Biggs. The series covers Mrs Charmian Biggs' journey from naïve young woman to Biggs' wife and the mother of three young sons. Money worries force her husband to ask for a loan from Bruce Reynolds, planner of one of the most famous crimes in British history, the Great Train Robbery of August 1963. The aftermath of the train robbery and Biggs subsequent escape from prison leads to a life of flight for Charmian and her children as she tries to keep the family together.

Charmian Biggs is played by Sheridan Smith; Ronnie Biggs is played by Daniel Mays. The series was written by Jeff Pope, in co-operation with the real Charmian Biggs. Smith's performance as Charmian received widespread critical acclaim, and she ultimately won the 2013 BAFTA Television Award for Best Actress.

Cast
Sheridan Smith as Charmian Biggs. The wife of the Great Train Robber Ronnie Biggs. For her performance, Smith won the BAFTA TV Award for Best Actress and nominations for the National Television Award for Outstanding Female Dramatic Performance and the Royal Television Society for Best Actress.
Daniel Mays as Ronnie Biggs. For his performance, Mays gained a nomination for the National Television Awards for Outstanding Male Dramatic Performance.
Adrian Scarborough as Bernard Powell, Charmian's father
Caroline Goodall as Muriel Powell, Charmian's mother
Florence Bell as Gillian Powell, Charmian's sister
Jay Simpson as Bruce Reynolds
Claire Rushbrook as Ruby Wright
Jack Lowden as Alan Wright
Tom Brooke as Mike Haynes
Leo Gregory as Eric Flower
Freya Stafford as Julie Flower
Denise Roberts as Annie
Phil Cornwell as Detective Sergeant Jack Slipper
Robin Hooper as Mr Kerslake
Luke Newberry as Gordon
Iain McKee as Charlie Wilson
Matthew Cullum as Buster Edwards
Jon Foster as Goody
Ron Cook as Peter
George Oliver as Polish Henry

Production notes
The series was filmed in London, Surrey, Buckinghamshire, Manchester, Adelaide and Melbourne.

Scenes of the Great Train Robbery were recreated on the East Lancashire Railway using a locomotive from the same batch of engines involved in the 1963 raid.

Charmian Biggs acted as a consultant on the series and flew to Britain from Australia in February 2012, just before filming began. She also visited Ronnie, who was ill; the couple had divorced in 1976 but remain on good terms. Some of the names in the series were changed for legal reasons.

Charmian met actress Sheridan Smith and sat with her at the manuscript read-through.

While filming in Australia, Sheridan Smith and Daniel Mays spent an evening at Charmian’s house, where she showed them her archive of personal letters and scrapbooks.

Charmian herself appears in the background of one of the scenes in the public gallery of the Australian court when the lawyer is arguing for her to be released.

Episode list

DVD
A region 2, two disc set of the series was released on 15 October 2012.

References

External links

2010s British drama television series
2012 British television series debuts
2012 British television series endings
British crime television series
English-language television shows
ITV television dramas
Television series set in the 1960s
Television series set in the 1970s
Television shows set in Brazil
Television shows set in England
Television shows set in Melbourne
Television shows set in South Australia
Television series by ITV Studios